Betnoti is a small town in the Mayurbhanj district in the state of Odisha, India. It is the block headquarter of the Betnoti block.

Geography

The population is around 10,000.

Communication

Betnoti is well connected by road and railway. Buses to Bhubaneswar, Kolkata, and Jamshedpur are available from here. The Bangriposi - Bhubaneswar Superfast Express, Bangriposi-Balasore DEMU run through here daily. Simlipal Intercity Express which connects Baripada & Shalimar, W.B. and passes via Betnoti, runs thrice a week.

Betnoti is about to become a "Notified Area Council". There are small-scale industries, financial institutions, national banks and utilities in the village. It manufactures sabai rope and sal-leaf plates.

Education

There are many schools and colleges in Betnoti, including Betnoti College, one of the top colleges under North Orissa University which provides higher secondary, and graduate level academics in various disciplines. Other schools include Maharaja Pratap Chandra High School, Munilal High School, Sathilo High School, Jawahar Navodaya Vidyalaya, Odisha Adarsha Vidyalaya, Divyajyoti Convent School, Saraswati Shishu Vidya Mandir, Betnoti Public School, St. Xavier's High School, Vivekananda Kendra, St. Xaviar Play School and Sri Aurobinda Purnaga Sikhya Kendra 10 to 15 km away from here is also a fast growing school. There is also a residential + 2 science college in the town named Sai Birdaban Institute of Science and Technology (SIST).

References

 

Villages in Mayurbhanj district